The International Panorama Council (IPC) is a nongovernmental, not-for-profit organization, subject to Swiss law. It is a global network involving museum directors, managers, artists, restorers and historians who deal with the historical or the contemporary art and media forms of the panorama. The organization comprises members from all over the world who are either representatives of museums and research institutes or private researchers and enthusiasts.
The organization was founded in 1992 as the European Panorama Conference in Szeged, Hungary, and renamed in 1998 in Altoetting, Germany, at the International Panorama Conference. Since 2003 the organization is called International Panorama Council. IPC has been a Membership Association since 2010. It is governed by a member-elected Executive Board whose Secretary-General acts as the operational center for the Board’s members.

Main goals
The purpose of the International Panorama Council is to stimulate worldwide research and communication about existing and future panoramas and cycloramas, advocate for and help preserve the few surviving heritage panoramas, and promote professional affiliation. IPC serves as a bridge connecting the heritage era of the panorama art form to its contemporary and future manifestations, and strives to facilitate the formal international recognition and protection of panoramas by organizations like UNESCO and the Council of Europe.
The International Panorama Council actively supports the preservation of historical panoramas and cycloramas. In 2007 and 2008 it started a lobbying campaign to save the endangered panorama painting and building in Innsbruck, Austria.
An initiative was taken to support the protection of the endangered Panorama Mesdag.
A further goal of the IPC is to have the most important historical panoramas from 19c. enrolled as UNESCO World Heritage sites. A first step has been taken in July 2008 when the Waterloo Panorama was added to Belgium's tentative proposal for the UNESCO list. In February 2009 Panorama Mesdag applied for inclusion in the tentative list of the Netherlands.

Activities
IPC is active in the fields of restoration, research, financing, exhibiting and marketing of panoramas and related art forms from the heritage era to its contemporary and future manifestations. IPC maintains a database of existing panoramas/cycloramas, Moving panoramas, large-scale dioramas and semi-circle panoramas and many other related art and media forms.

Annual conferences
Since 1992 the International Panorama Council has held annual conferences throughout the world. The conferences are planned to provide a meaningful, professional exchange of ideas with lunches and dinners included, and a joint post-conference excursion to a panorama related site. Presentations in the conference proceedings range from illustrated essays on topographical mapping to restoration and conservation techniques. 
1992 Szeged-Ópusztaszer, Hungary: Past, Present and Future of Panoramas, founding conference of IPC as a European-based group of interest. In cooperation with Móra Ferenc Museum, Szeged
1993 Bonn, Germany: Sehsucht – Eräugnis und Ent-Täuschung, über die Veränderung der visuellen Wahrnehmung im 20. Jahrhundert. In cooperation with Kunst- und Ausstellungshalle, Bonn
1994 Wroclaw, Poland: 100th Anniversary of the Panorama Racławicka
1995 Szeged-Ópusztaszer, Hungary: Inauguration of the Feszty Panorama (Arrival of the Hungarians)
1996 Innsbruck, Austria: 100th Anniversary of Panorama "Battle of Mt. Isel"
1998 Altoetting, Germany, The World of Panoramas, Panoramas of the World, 1st IPC World Conference
1999 Lucerne, Switzerland, The ongoing restoration Bourbaki Panorama
2000 Szeged-Ópusztaszer, Hungary, Panoramas and Tourism, PR and Management
2001 Beijing, China, Panorama Development and Maintenance. In cooperation with The Museum of the War of Chinese People's Resistance Against Japanese Aggression at Beijing
2002 Pleven, Bulgaria, 25th Anniversary of the Panorama ‘Battle of Pleven’. In cooperation with the Military Historical Museums and the Pleven Epopee 1877 Panorama
2003 Altoetting/Lorsch, Germany, 100th anniversary of panorama "Jerusalem on the Day of the Crucifixion" and opening  of "Stauffer Panorama" at the Lorsch Abbey
2004 New York City, United States, Panoramas in the Old World and the New. In cooperation with Hunter College
2005 Shenyang, China, Panorama Conservation and Restoration Technology. In cooperation with Lu Xun Academy of Fine Arts
2006 The Hague, Netherlands, The Quest for Illusion – 125th Anniversary of Panorama Mesdag
2007 New Haven, Connecticut, United States, New Perspectives on the Panorama. In cooperation with Yale Center for British Art, Yale University
2007 Plymouth, England, United Kingdom, Panoramas in the Virtual World. In cooperation with Innovate – Centre for Creative Industries, University of Plymouth
2008 Leipzig/Dresden, Germany, Spatial Simulation and the Future of Panorama. In cooperation with Asisi Factory GmbH, Berlin
2009 Brussels, Belgium, Panorama Redevelopment: Restoration and Repositioning. In cooperation with the Royal Museum of the Armed Forces and of Military History
2010 Istanbul, Turkey, Panoramas Bridging Cultures and Time. In cooperation with the Culture Co., a subsidiary of the Greater City of Istanbul
2011 Gettysburg, Pennsylvania, United States, Preserving and Understanding the Battlefield Panorama Heritage. In cooperation with the Gettysburg Foundation
2012 Pleven, Bulgaria, Historic Battles in Panorama Format messages and challenges. In cooperation with the Military Historical Museums and the Pleven Epopee 1877 Panorama
2013 Lucerne, Switzerland, Panoramic Spectacles - A Tourist Attraction Then and Now
2014 Altoetting, Germany, The Panoramic Experience: Real – Virtual – Spiritual. In cooperation with the Foundation for the Panorama Altoetting
2015 Namur, Belgium, Layers of History: Panoramas from Classical to Digital Age. In cooperation with the City of Namur the University of Namur and the Luxembourg City History Museum
2016 Ópusztaszer, Hungary, Fiction and Reality in Panoramas. In cooperation with the Ópusztaszer National Heritage Park and the Feszty-Panorama
2017 Queens/New York City, United States, (Re)Thinking The Panorama. In cooperation with the Queens Museum
2018 Istanbul, Turkey, Memory and the Panorama. In cooperation with the Panorama 1453 History Museum, Istanbul.
2019 Atlanta, Georgia, United States, Panoramic Ironies. In cooperation with the Atlanta History Center, Atlanta, US.
2020 Bursa. Turkey, Online 29th International Panorama Council Conference. In cooperation with the Panorama 1326 Bursa Conquest Museum, Bursa, Turkey.

See also
Panorama
Panoramic painting
Moving panorama
Cyclorama
Cosmorama
Immersion (virtual reality)
Virtual reality

Literature
Gabriele Koller (ed.), Die Welt der Panoramen. Zehn Jahre Internationale Panorama Konferenzen / The World of Panoramas. Ten Years of International Panorama Conferences, Amberg 2003
Gabriele Koller (ed.), The Panorama in the Old World and the New. Based on the proceedings of the 12th International Panorama Conference, November 2004, Hunter College of the City University of New York, organised by the International Panorama Council and the Art Department of Hunter College of the City University of New York, Amberg 2010
Gabriele Koller (ed.): More Than Meet the Eye : the Magic of the Panorama. Amberg: Büro Wilhelm, 2019
Gebhard Streicher (ed.), Panorama: Virtualität und Realitäten. 11. Internationale Panoramakonferenz in Altötting 2003 / Panorama: Virtuality and Realities. 11th International Panorama Conference in Altötting 2003, Altötting 2005
Stephan Oettermann, Das Panorama. Die Geschichte eines Massenmediums, Frankfurt am Main 1980
Sehsucht. Das Panorama als Massenunterhaltung des 19. Jahrhunderts, Kunst- und Ausstellungshalle der Bundesrepublik Deutschland in Bonn, Basel und Frankfurt am Main 1993
Ralph Hyde (ed.), Panoramania! The Art and Entertainment of the “all-embracing” View, Barbican Art Gallery, London 1988
Tagungsbericht der Internationalen historisch-kunstwissenschaftlichen Konferenz "Panoramamalerei in der Weltkunstgeschichte" anlässlich des hundertsten Jahrestages des Panoramas "Verteidigung Sevastopols 1854-1855" am 25. Mai 2005, ed. Sevastopoler städtische Staatsadministration, Sevastopoler Stadtrat, Das Museum der heldenhaften Verteidigung und Befreiung Sevastopol, Sevastopol 2007
The Panorama Phenomenon. The World round!, The Hague 2006

References
Most of the information in this article is taken from Gabriele Koller, (ed.), Die Welt der Panoramen. Zehn Jahre Internationale Panorama Konferenzen / The World of Panoramas. Ten Years of International Panorama Conferences, Amberg 2003. The rest of the information is cited from the organization’s webpage and the following sources:

External links 
Website of the International Panorama Council IPC
Panorama Waterloo on Belgium's tentative list for UNESCO world heritage

Museum organizations
International cultural organizations
Panoramic art
International organizations based in the United States